The Scottish Vocational Educational Council (SCOTVEC) was the awarding body for vocational qualifications in Scotland from 1985 until 1997.

SCOTVEC was established by the merger of the Scottish Business Education Council (SCOTBEC) and the Scottish Technical Education Council (SCOTEC) in 1985. It awarded the vast majority of Scottish vocational qualifications. In 1997, SCOTVEC merged with its academic counterpart, the Scottish Examination Board, to form the Scottish Qualifications Authority.

References

Examination boards in the United Kingdom
Educational organisations based in Scotland
Government agencies established in 1985
Government agencies disestablished in 1997
1985 establishments in Scotland
1997 disestablishments in Scotland
Vocational education in Scotland